Tan Tjong Sian (born 26 April 1931) is an Indonesian sailor. He competed in the Flying Dutchman event at the 1968 Summer Olympics.

References

External links
 

1931 births
Living people
Indonesian male sailors (sport)
Olympic sailors of Indonesia
Sailors at the 1968 Summer Olympics – Flying Dutchman
People from Yogyakarta